Papaipema limpida, the vernonia borer, is a species of cutworm or dart moth in the family Noctuidae. It is found in North America.

The MONA or Hodges number for Papaipema limpida is 9507.

References

Further reading

External links

 

Papaipema
Articles created by Qbugbot
Moths described in 1852